Legislative elections were held in Kazakhstan on 18 August 2007. President Nursultan Nazarbayev's Nur Otan party received 88% of the vote and won all of the available seats. None of the six other parties contesting the election passed the 7% threshold to win seats.

Background
On 19 June 2007, 50 out of 77 members of Mazhilis voted to request President Nursultan Nazarbayev for it to be dissolved after a ruling by the Constitutional Council from 18 June that the Mazhilis can dissolve itself only with the permission of the president despite the Kazakh Constitution allowing the parliament to do so in a "vote of no-confidence". Nazarbayev accepted the request that same day and the Mazhilis was officially dissolved on 20 June. The move was criticized by several prominent opposition activists such as Chairman of JUDSP, Zharmakhan Tuyakbay, who claimed that the a snap election gave little time to prepare for the polling day.

Electoral system
A total of 107 seats were at stake in the Majilis, an increase of 30, following constitutional amendments earlier in the year. Under the changes, 98 deputies were elected by party lists, an increase from just 10 in the previous parliament. The remaining nine seats were reserved for members elected by the Assembly of People of Kazakhstan.

Conduct
The opposition Nationwide Social Democratic Party, which received almost 5% of the vote, denounced the election, and the Organization for Security and Co-operation in Europe observers said the election showed some progress, but was also marred by problems, saying that "in over 40 percent of the polling stations visited, [vote counting] was described as bad or very bad", which was worse than in the last parliamentary and presidential elections. Bias in the state media was also considered a problem.

Results

Notes

References

External links 
Elections of the Majilis 2007 Central Election Commission

Kazakhstan
Legislative
Elections in Kazakhstan